Larvik District Court is a district court located in Larvik, Norway.  It covers the municipalities of  Larvik and Lardal and is subordinate Agder Court of Appeal.

References

External links 
Official site 

Defunct district courts of Norway
Organisations based in Larvik